Touch the Sky is the second and final album by Eurodance group A Touch of Class. The album was released on March 23, 2003, proving to be unsuccessful. The album peaked at number 97 in Germany and failed to chart anywhere else. A Touch of Class ultimately decided to go their separate ways after the album's release due to the commercial failure of the album.

Track listing
"Call on Me"
"Star"
"I'm in Heaven (When You Kiss Me)"
"New York City"
"Set Me Free"
"No Place Like Home"
"Secret World"
"Touch the Sky"
"Moment in Time"
"I'm Gonna Make You Mine"
"Maybe"
"Baby, Bye, Bye"

Music videos
"I'm in Heaven (When You Kiss Me)"
"Set Me Free"
"New York City"

Chart positions

References

2003 albums
A Touch of Class (band) albums
Sony BMG albums